The Swahili Wikipedia is the Swahili language edition of Wikipedia. It is the largest edition of Wikipedia in a Niger Kordofern, Niger–Congo or Nilo-Saharan language, followed by the Yoruba Wikipedia. 

It was mentioned on August 27, 2006, in International Herald Tribune and New York Newsday articles on the struggles of smaller Wikipedia language editions. In 2009, Google sponsored the creation of articles in the Swahili Wikipedia. On June 20, 2009, the Swahili Wikipedia gave its main page a makeover.

The Swahili Wikipedia is the second most popular Wikipedia in Tanzania and Kenya after the English version with respectively 14% and 4% of the visits, as of January 2021.

References

External links
  Swahili Wikipedia
 Statistics for Swahili Wikipedia

Swahili-language websites
Wikipedias by language
African encyclopedias
Internet properties established in 2006